Câlnic is a commune in Gorj County, Oltenia, Romania. It is composed of nine villages: Câlnic, Câlnicu de Sus, Didilești, Găleșoaia, Hodoreasca, Pieptani, Pinoasa, Stejerei and Vâlceaua.

See also 
 Castra of Pinoasa

References

Communes in Gorj County
Localities in Oltenia